Der Töpfer (The Potter) is a singspiel, described as a komische Oper, in one act by Johann André. The libretto was by the composer. The work was one of the first German operas to be published in full score.

Performance history
The opera was first performed in Hanau on 22 January 1773. It was a success and was praised by Johann Wolfgang von Goethe for its simplicity and beauty.

Roles

Synopsis
Marthe, hoping to win a lottery, tries to put off the marriage of her daughter Hannchen to Gürge with the intention of making a better match.

References

Bauman, Thomas (1992), "Töpfer, Der" in The New Grove Dictionary of Opera, ed. Stanley Sadie (London) 

1773 operas
Operas by Johann André
German-language operas
Singspiele
Operas